Onata Aprile is an American actress, best known for playing the title role in the 2012 film What Maisie Knew, and a supporting role in the 2015 film About Scout.

Early life and education 
Aprile was born on April 24, 2005 in Mohnton, Pennsylvania, and at the age of two she moved to New York City.

Career 
Aprile started her career in 2010 by appearing in the TV series Law & Order: Special Victims Unit, and then starred in the films like Yellow and The History of Future Folk. In 2012, she played the titular role in the drama film What Maisie Knew, along with Julianne Moore and Alexander Skarsgård. Her performance was praised by critics.

Personal life 
Aprile's father David Statler has a Dragonfly Studio and Gallery in West Reading, Pennsylvania, while she lives in New York with her mother, artist and actress Valentine Aprile. Her paternal grandmother is Japanese.

Filmography

Film

Television

References

External links 
 

Living people
People from Berks County, Pennsylvania
Actresses from Pennsylvania
Actresses from New York City
21st-century American actresses
American actresses of Japanese descent
American child actresses
Year of birth missing (living people)
American film actresses
American film actors of Asian descent